Verde in Spanish, Portuguese, Italian  and Romanian means "Green".

It may refer to:

Places

Aguas Verdes, Peru
Verde Beach, Portugal
Camp Verde, Arizona, United States
Campina Verde, Brazil
Cape Verde
Castro Verde, Portugal
Fort Verde State Historic Park, in Camp Verde
Verde Island, Philippines
Verde River, Arizona
Palos Verdes, California
Mato Verde, Brazil
Mesa Verde National Park, Colorado, United States
Monte Verde, archeological site in Chile
Ponta Verde, a beach in Brazil
Rancho Palos Verdes, California
Río Verde
Val Verde
Verde Valley, Arizona, United States
Hotel Verde,Zanzibar,Tanzania

Other
Verde (surname)
Verdes FC, a Belize Premier Football League team
Verde Canyon Railroad, a heritage railroad in Arizona
Vinho Verde, a type of Portuguese wine
Verde (grape), another name for the Italian wine grape Verdeca
Visualizing Energy Resources Dynamically on the Earth (VERDE), a software visualization and analysis capability of the United States Department of Energy
"Verde", a song by J Balvin from Colores, 2020

See also
 Valverde (disambiguation)